Southend-on-Sea was a parliamentary constituency centred on the then-town of Southend-on-Sea in Essex.  It returned one Member of Parliament to the House of Commons of the Parliament of the United Kingdom.

History 
The constituency was created under the Representation of the People Act 1918 by splitting the County Borough of Southend-on-Sea from the existing constituency of South East Essex. The sitting MP for that constituency, Rupert Guinness, was elected to the new constituency. It was abolished for the 1950 general election, when the expanded County Borough (which had incorporated the Urban District of Shoeburyness) was divided into the new constituencies of Southend East and Southend West.

Boundaries
1918–1945: The County Borough of Southend-on-Sea.

1945–1950: Part of the County Borough of Southend-on-Sea. (No changes to constituency boundaries).

Members of Parliament

Guinness family
For most of the 20th century, this constituency and one of its successors was held by four members of the Guinness family. When Rupert Guinness was elevated to the Peerage upon the death of his father, he was succeeded by his wife, Gwendolen. When she retired in 1935 she was succeeded by her eldest daughter's husband, Henry "Chips" Channon. Channon continued to serve as MP for one of the successor constituencies, Southend West, until his death in 1958. That seat was then represented by his son, Paul Channon, until 1997. Because of this connection, the seat became known in the media as "Guinness-on-Sea".

Elections

Elections in the 1910s

Elections in the 1920s

Elections in the 1930s 

General Election 1939–40

Another General Election was required to take place before the end of 1940. The political parties had been making preparations for an election to take place and by the Autumn of 1939, the following candidates had been selected; 
Conservative: Henry Channon
Liberal: Philip Whitehead
Labour: GR Sandison

Elections in the 1940s

References

Parliamentary constituencies in Essex (historic)
Politics of Southend-on-Sea
Constituencies of the Parliament of the United Kingdom established in 1918
Constituencies of the Parliament of the United Kingdom disestablished in 1950